Saarländisches Bergbaumuseum is a museum of mining in Saarland, Germany.

External links
Official site

Museums in Saarland
Mining museums in Germany